Crypticon is a horror-oriented media event held annually in Minneapolis, Minnesota, Seattle, Washington, and Kansas City, Missouri. Guests have included authors, actors, directors, producers, and writers from classic and upcoming horror titles.

Overview
Crypticon is composed of three areas open to the general public:
 The Dealers' Area, which is made up primarily of vendors selling horror-themed merchandise and booths advertising films, and guests signing and meeting fans.
 The Auditorium, where panels and speeches are given for the duration of the convention, including exclusive interviews with the guests.
 And The Screening Rooms, where new independent and mainstream horror films are screened via digital projection.

Conventions

2017
Happy Hunting (2016 film) wins Best Feature Film.

2014
Crypticon Seattle was held May 23–25, 2014 at Seatac Hilton Hotel and Convention center in Seattle, Wa

2013
On May 24–26, 2013, Crypticon Seattle took place at the Seatac Hilton Hotel in Seatac, Washington

Guests of Honor
 Cassandra Peterson
 Fred Williamson
 John Carl Buechler
 Nicholas Brendon
 Josh Stewart
 Diane Franklin
 Tyler Mane
 Derek Mears
 Joe Bob Briggs
 Dana Ashbrook
 Lew Temple
 Eileen Dietz
 James Duvall
 Vincent M. Ward

Crypticon Kansas City was held Aug 16-18 in Kansas City, MO

Guests of Honor
 Sid Haig
 Bill Moseley
 Tom Savini
 Ernie Hudson
 Margot Kidder
 Ken Foree
 Debbie Rochon
 William Forsythe
 Bai Ling
 C. Thomas Howell
 R.A. Mihailoff
 Tiffany Shepis
 Fred Williamson
 Richard Kiel
 Lew Temple
 Doug Jones
 John Carl Buechler

Crypticon Minnesota was held September 27–29 at the Doubletree in Bloomington, MN

Guests of Honor
 Billy Dee Williams
 Ted Raimi
 Stephen Constantino
 Cory Dee Williams
 Dan Payne
 Don Coscarelli
 Kathryn Leigh Scott
 Betsy Baker
 Ellen Sandweiss
 Theresa Tilly
 Adrian Paul

2012
On May 27–29, Crypticon Seattle took place at the Seatac Hilton Hotel in Seatac, Washington.

Guests of Honor
 Doug Bradley
 Dee Wallace
 J. Larose
 Richard Kiel
 Voltaire (musician)
 Marilyn Burns
 Ricou Browning
 Don Coscarelli
 Sonny Landham
 James O'Barr
 Gangrel (wrestler)
 Cerina Vincent
 Danielle Harris
 Robert Jayne

Crypticon Minnesota was held September 28–30 in Minneapolis, MN

Guests of Honor
 Sid Haig
 Tom Savini
 Tony Curran
 Peter Shinkoda
 Richard Kiel
 Cerina Vincent
 Sean Whalen
 Robert Jayne
 Taso Stavrakis
 David Hedison
 Richard Brooker
 Melanie Kinnaman

2011
On May 27–29, Crypticon Seattle took place at the Seatac Hilton Hotel in Seatac, Washington.

Guests of Honor
 Bill Moseley
 Linnea Quigley
 P. J. Soles
 Andrew Bryniarski
 Barbara Magnolfi
 Philip Nutman
 C. J. Graham
 Jewel Shepard
 Alex Vincent
 David Katims
 Tom Fridley
 Aaron Smolinski
 Frank Dux

2010
On June 18–20, 2010, the Crypticon Seattle Horror Convention took place at the Holiday Inn in Everett, Washington.

Guests of Honor - Seattle
 Margot Kidder
 Doug Jones
 Kane Hodder
 Ernie Hudson
 Camden Toy
 Nick Mamatas
 John Skipp
 Cody Goodfellow
 Felissa Rose
 Heather Langenkamp
 Andras Jones
 Brooke Bundy
 Rodney Eastman

Crypticon Minnesota was November 5, 6 and 7, 2010 in Bloomington, Minnesota at the Bloomington Sheraton.

Guests of Honor - Minnesota
 Jeffrey Combs
 Bruce Abbott
 Kathleen Kinmont
 Dee Wallace
 Brian Krause
 Jason Lively
 Tom Sullivan
 Walter Phelan
 Jake McKinnon
 Sean Clark

Past conventions

2009
On June 5–7, 2009, the Crypticon Seattle Horror Convention took place at the Northwest Rooms at Seattle Center in Seattle, Washington.

Guests of Honor
 Doug Jones (Hellboy)
 Don Coscarelli (Phantasm, Bubba Ho Tep)
 Bill Thornbury (Phantasm)
 Reggie Bannister (Phantasm)
 Adrienne Barbeau (The Fog)
 Tom Atkins (The Fog)
 Charles Cyphers (Halloween, The Fog)
 Nancy Loomis (Halloween, The Fog)
 Ken Foree (Dawn Of The Dead)
 Electra and Elise Avellan (Grindhouse)
 Michael Berryman (The Hills Have Eyes)
 Bob Elmore (Texas Chainsaw Massacre 2)
 Brian Sipe (FX Lord Of Illusions, Cirque Du Freak)
 Lloyd Kaufman (Troma Pictures)
 Carleton Mellick III (gonzo author)
 Charlotte J. Helmkamp (Frankenhooker)
 Brooke Lewis (scream queen)
 Eileen Dietz (The Exorcist)
 Tiffany Shepis (scream queen, Troma actress, Bonnie And Clyde vs. Dracula)
 Bob L. Morgan (shock fiction author)
 Troy Holbrook (Bodybag Photography and FX)

2008
On May 23–25, 2008, the Crypticon Seattle Horror Convention took place at the DoubleTree Hotel in SeaTac, Washington. 
Guests of Honor
 Bill Moseley
 William Forsythe
 Danielle Harris
 Mark Kidwell
 Adrienne King
 Jason Mewes
 Sid Haig
 Ari Lehman
 Betsy Palmer
 Tony Todd
 Roddy Piper

References

External links 

Culture of Seattle
Everett, Washington
Festivals in Washington (state)
Horror conventions
Recurring events established in 2008
Seattle Area conventions
Washington (state) culture